"Chaise Longue" is the debut single by English rock duo Wet Leg, released through Domino Recording Company on 15 June 2021 as the lead single from their eponymous debut album (2022). The song went viral in 2021, having had millions of streams and video views, and it won the Grammy for Best Alternative Music Performance at the 65th Annual Grammy Awards

Background and composition
The song was released on 15 June 2021. "Chaise Longue" has been described as a tongue-in-cheek post-punk song. The track starts with a minimalistic drum beat and bass line, with the vocals sung in a deadpan style and a guitar joining in later in the song. The lyric "Is your muffin buttered?/Would you like us to assign someone to butter your muffin?" is a direct quotation from the 2004 teen comedy Mean Girls.

It was written in 2019 in a single day by vocalist Rhian Teasdale while she was sitting on an actual chaise longue owned by guitarist Hester Chambers's grandfather. A music video, also directed by Teasdale, was released on the same day as the release of the single.

Track listings

Charts

Certifications

Release history

References

2021 debut singles
2021 songs
Wet Leg songs
Domino Recording Company singles
British garage rock songs
British new wave songs
Garage punk songs